James Michael Colquitt (born January 17, 1963) is a former American football punter of the National Football League (NFL). He was signed by the Seattle Seahawks as an undrafted free agent in 1985, playing in two games for them. He played college football at Tennessee.

He is the brother of former NFL punter Craig Colquitt and uncle to Craig's sons, current NFL punters Britton Colquitt and Dustin Colquitt.

References

1963 births
Living people
Players of American football from Knoxville, Tennessee
American football punters
Tennessee Volunteers football players
Seattle Seahawks players
Colquitt family